Eugene Khumbanyiwa is a Malawian South Africa-based stage, television, film and voice actor, popularly known for playing the role of Obesandjo in the 2009 Oscar nominated sci-fi hit District 9.

Early life and education
Khumbanyiwa was born at Cobbe Barracks Hospital in Zomba, Malawi's former capital. His father is Major Stewart Khumbanyiwa, a retired soldier, and his mother a retired primary school teacher. He got fascinated by performing arts at a very young age. He stated that as a kid, growing up at Nandolo in Zomba, his mother would take him and his siblings to Zomba Gymkhana club to watch the late Malawian playwright, director, actor and founder of the first professional theatre company in Malawi, the Wakhumbata Ensemble Theatre Du Chisiza Junior, perform on stage, as well as to University of Malawi, Chancellor College's The Great Hall, where they would watch popular drama groups like Kwathu Drama Group perform. Also, his father loved classic western and action movies, and he would take him and his older brother over the weekend to a hall nearby at St Charles Lwanga parish center, where a film company called ASTRA cinemas would come and show movies. His father's joy, subconscious gestures, and the excitement when watching these movies made the young Khumbanyiwa believe in the magic of movies and cinema, how movies can bring out various emotions in people and at the same time make for a great family time. He was attracted to that magic and dreamt of being a part of it.

While in high school he started performing in self-penned plays on stage. Sometimes he would  get in trouble with teachers for performing funny and entertaining skits in class.

He attended his primary school at Cobbe Barracks, Mponda and Police primary school. His Secondary school at Blantyre and Malawi Army Secondary School. Upon completion at Army Secondary School, he was voted the most popular student by fellow students. This was largely due to his love and passion for performing arts.

He did his tertiary education in Nairobi, Kenya .Studied computer science at Universal Group of Colleges, also Microsoft Certified Systems Engineer at Institute of Advanced Technology, Nairobi, Kenya.

He moved to South Africa and worked as an IT specialist before pursuing his childhood dream of becoming a professional actor. He was involved in the implementation of Department of Justice Digital Nervous System (DoJ-DNS), offering his services in IT skills as a contract IT trainer. Training the department staff members in Pretoria and Johannesburg  including judges, magistrates, prosecutors and assessors in basic IT skills.

Career

He started his acting career as an extra in the 2004 Oscar-nominated Hotel Rwanda, starring Don Cheadle and Sophie Okonedo, playing one of the hotel staff members. After that he worked sporadically, hustling his way in the film industry by appearing in TV commercials and prime-time soaps like Generations, Scandal, and also had a role in South African independently produced hit film Gangster's Paradise: Jerusalema before landing a role as an underground warlord in the Peter Jackson-produced and Neill Blomkamp-directed four-times Oscar-nominated sci-fi hit District 9 Upon gaining critical acclaim for his performance in District 9, he attracted new international attention and even appeared in an American TV commercial for a famous cyber fraud security product called 'Identity Guard.'.

He went on to feature in Hollywood movies like Death Race 3: Inferno, alongside stars like Danny Trejo and Luke Goss, also appeared in Chappie starring Sharlto Copley, Hugh Jackman, Dev Patel and Sigourney Weaver. He teamed up with director Blomkamp again and Sigourney Weaver playing lead role Amir the saviour in a short sci-fi film called Rakka. Khumbanyiwa has appeared in three of Hollywood director Neill Blomkamp's films.

He played Pastor Peter in a two time BAFTA-winner Damilola, Our Loved Boy, a British television film about the events surrounding the 27 November 2000 death of Damilola Taylor. The film aired on BBC One on 7 November 2016, and was written by Levi David Addai, directed by Euros Lyn, and starred Babou Ceesay and Wunmi Mosaku. He also appeared in the critically acclaimed US TV miniseries The Looming Tower, directed by Alex Gibney which premiered on Hulu on February 28, 2018, starring Jeff Daniels and Peter Sarsgaard, based on Lawrence Wright's 2006 book of the same name. He played a Kenyan security guard at the US Embassy in Nairobi who survived the embassy bombing and became a crucial witness.

He has over 25 screen acting credits to his name. He does voices for both TV and radio. His voice work credits include the prestigious Africa Cup of Nations (AFCON2013) soccer tournament's "hello" radio ads campaign for the City of Johannesburg.

On 9 July 2016, Khumbanyiwa was awarded the Best Achiever in Entertainment at the Malawi Achievers Awards- South Africa.

Filmography

Film

Television

References

External links 
 
  Eugene Khumbanyiwa

Malawian male actors
1976 births
Living people